The Ji'an Evening Post, also known as Ji'an Evening News, was a Chinese-language evening newspaper published in China.  It was founded in Ji'an on July 1, 1993  as a county-level a Chinese Communist Party newspaper. 

In May 2000, the State Council of China permitted Ji'an to revoke its prefectural status and reconstitute itself as a city (撤地设市), and Ji'an Evening Post was transferred to the ownership of the Jinggangshan Daily Agency (井冈山报社).

History
Ji'an Evening Post was introduced on July 1, 1993. On January 1, 2001, the publication underwent a comprehensive revision and was positioned as an urban livelihood newspaper. 

At the end of 2019, the paper announced that it would cease publication on January 1, 2020.

References

Defunct newspapers published in China
Publications established in 1993
1993 establishments in China
Publications disestablished in 2020